The 2011 SA Tennis Open was a men's tennis tournament to be played on hard courts indoors. It was the 20th edition of the SA Tennis Open and was part of the ATP World Tour 250 series of the 2011 ATP World Tour. It took place in Johannesburg, South Africa from 30 January through 6 February 2011.

Finals

Singles

 Kevin Anderson defeated  Somdev Devvarman, 4–6, 6–3, 6–2
 It was Anderson's first career title.

Doubles

 James Cerretani /  Adil Shamasdin defeated  Scott Lipsky /  Rajeev Ram, 6–3, 3–6, [10–7]

Entrants

Seeds

 Rankings are as of 17 January 2011.

Other entrants
The following players received wildcards into the singles main draw:
  Rik de Voest
  Izak van der Merwe
  Fritz Wolmarans

The following players received entry from the qualifying draw:

  Stefano Galvani
  Raven Klaasen
  Milos Raonic
  Nikala Scholtz

External links
Official website

 
SA Tennis Open
SA Tennis Open
Sports competitions in Johannesburg
2010s in Johannesburg
January 2011 sports events in Africa
February 2011 sports events in Africa